Castle Rock is a village in the Uttara Kannada district of the Indian state of Karnataka. The village is located in the Western Ghats on the state's border with Goa - at an elevation of 621 m (2,040 ft).

Located in a heavily forested area, Castle Rock's vegetation is moist tropical deciduous. Manganese mines form the main economy of the region. The village lies within the Dandeli Tiger Reserve.

For many years, the village marked the frontier between Portuguese-held Goa and British-held India. A metre gauge railway line used to connect the Goan towns of Vasco and Margao with the rest of India and was the only rail link in the state till the Konkan Railway started services in the early 1990s. In the early 1990s, the Indian Railways converted the metre gauge line to broad gauge, thus connecting the old rail network with the rest of India. Metre gauge tracks can still be seen at the Castle Rock railway station.

Transport 

An international connection that did exist in the past but is no longer a possibility is that between India both British India and independent India and the territory of Goa, which until 1961 was a colony of Portugal and not part of India. 

The MG railway line from Marmagao railway station to Castle Rock railway station was originally owned and operated by the West of India Portuguese Railway which despite its name was a British company and it connected with the line in British India from Londa. 

The terminus of the line today is Vasco da Gama railway station. For travellers between Goa and British India, and later between Goa and India all the formalities of international travel including customs checks and verification of travel documents were carried out at Castle Rock.

This station marks the beginning of the Braganza Ghats from the Karnataka side. The nearby Dudhsagar Falls is one of the main tourist attractions of Goa.

Mining is now banned and the area has been named Dandeli-Anshi Tiger Reserve.

Castle Rock Forest Range

Castle Rock forest range office is within walking distance from the Castle Rock railway station. Castle Rock range is part of the Dandeli Wild Life Sanctuary, also known as Dandeli-Anshi Tiger Reserve.

External links

References 

Villages in Uttara Kannada district